White-footed ant can refer to:
Technomyrmex albipes
Technomyrmex difficilis
Technomyrmex vitiensis

Animal common name disambiguation pages